"A.M. 180" is a song by American indie rock band Grandaddy from their debut studio album, Under the Western Freeway (1997). It was released as a single in 1998 by record label Will.

Release 

It reached number 88 in the UK Singles Chart.

Legacy 

"A.M. 180" was featured prominently in the 2002 British film 28 Days Later. It is used as the opening theme music for the BBC Four television series, Charlie Brooker's Screenwipe. The song was used in a 2009 Dodge Journey advertisement. "A.M. 180" features in the "Eddsworld" episode, "Hello Hellhole". Belgian Indie rock band Girls In Hawaii regularly cover the song live, citing Grandaddy's 2003 set at Pukkelpop as paramount to their development as a band. Canadian pop punk band PUP released a cover version of the song in August 2020.

Track listing

 CD version

 7" version

References

External links
 

1998 singles
1997 songs
Grandaddy songs